Unframed is a South Korean streaming television series. Actors Park Jeong-min, Son Suk-ku, Choi Hee-seo and Lee Je-hoon each wrote and directed an episode of the series. It was released on the over-the-top media service Watcha on December 8, 2021.

Overview

Cast

Class Representative Election
 Kim Dam-ho
 Kang Ji-seok
 Park Hyo-eun
 Park Seung-joon

Rerun
 Im Sung-jae
 Byun Joong-ji
 Oh Min-ae

Bandi
 Park So-yi
 Choi Hee-seo
 Jo Kyung-seok
 Shin Hyun-soo

Blue Happiness
 Jung Hae-in
 Lee Dong-hwi
 Kim Da-ye
 Tang Jun-sang
 Pyo Ye-jin

Production

Development
On April 20, 2021, the streaming service Watcha announced the production of Unframed, a 4-part project which would mark Park Jeong-min, Son Suk-ku, Choi Hee-seo and Lee Je-hoon's directorial debuts. The project is produced by Hardcut.

Casting
The cast lineup was revealed on August 31, 2021.

Notes

References

External links
 

Korean-language television shows
2021 South Korean television series debuts
South Korean drama web series
South Korean anthology television series
South Korean pre-produced television series